Ferdows is a village in Esfandaqeh Rural District, in the Central District of Jiroft County, Kerman Province, Iran. At the 2006 census, its population was 592, in 161 families.

References 

Populated places in Jiroft County